William Brown was an 18th-century American composer, flutist, and music publisher, active in Philadelphia and New York. He is known for his work Three Rondos for the Pianoforte or Harpsichord (1787), one of the earliest pieces of printed secular music for keyboards, and the first keyboard music to be published in the United States.

References

External links

American male composers
American composers
18th-century classical composers
18th-century male musicians
18th-century musicians
Year of birth missing
Year of death missing